Misa Eguchi was the defending champion, but lost in the first round to Han Xinyun.
Daria Gavrilova won the title, defeating Irina Falconi in the final, 7–5, 7–5.

Seeds

Main draw

Finals

Top half

Bottom half

References 
 Main draw

McDonald's Burnie International - Singles
Burnie International